William Vanzela is a Brazil-born Italian goalkeeper who has been a long term goalkeeper of Baltimore Blast at Major Arena Soccer League. He has also played in Paraná Clube prior to joining the Blast. He was selected to represent Italy in the FIF7 Mundialito 2011 held in Brazil where they won the Championship. He was also awarded the best goalkeeper for 2 consecutive season in FIF7 from 2011-2012 and in 2013 he join Lazio (7v7) club and play in FIF7 World Club Championship.

References

https://www.maslsoccer.com/stats#/player/119670/stats MASL stats]
Longtime Blast Goalkeeper William Vanzela Aims For More Than Championships In Baltimore
to Know Baltimore Blast Goalie William Vanzela
Check out the winners of the best goalkeeper award of the last seasons
About William Vanzela

1985 births
Living people
Italian footballers
Baltimore Blast players
Major Arena Soccer League players
People from Cascavel
Brazilian people of Italian descent
Association football goalkeepers
Indoor soccer goalkeepers
San Diego Sockers players